The 80th UAV Squadron is a squadron in the Air Component of the Belgian Armed Forces. It is dedicated to unmanned aerial vehicles or UAVs. the Squadron got its name in recognition of the 80th Artillery Battalion of the Belgian Army that in its days was tasked to locate and identify enemy positions and targets. as of 2021 the unit will commences operations with two 9B SkyGuardian, in the aerial reconnaissance role, by 2031 the Squadron will operate a total of 4 to 6 MQ-9B SkyGuardian's which replaces the IAI B-Hunter in services from 2004 to 2020.

Mission

The 80 UAV Squadron 's mission is real-time aerial reconnaissance, surveillance and visual intelligence gathering, in supporting the Belgium Armed Forces. and other departments within the framework of aid to the nation such as surveillance of territorial waters, Forrest fires and agriculture    

Border surveillance
Fight against organized crime
Collecting information
Support to units of Belgium Armed Forces

Deployments

 ALTHEA mission in Bosnia-Herzegovina -2005
 EUFOR RD Congo Mission -2006

Operations from Belgium territory
Support to firefighters during fires in the Fens - 2004
Silent Watch mission over the North Sea (Monitoring the degassing of boats in the North Sea) 2008 -2020
Operation Vigilant Guardian - 2016
Collaborated with the Federal Public Finance Service during customs control operations 2017 - 2020
Game counting for the Department of Nature and Forests

Organisation

80th UAV Squadron consists of
HQ staff and Support  Flight
UAV Flight
Maintenance Flight

UAV Squadron, 80